Xylitol pentacetate is an organic compound with the formula C15H22O10. It is an acetylated sugar alcohol that is used as an intermediary in the production of xylitol pentanitrate. It is also commonly made to isolate and identify xylitol from complex organic mixtures.

Synthesis 
Xylitol pentacetate is made by the addition of acetic anhydride and sodium acetate to xylitol.

References

Acetate esters